Vadym Antipov (born 11 September 1988 in Ukrainian SSR, Soviet Union) is a Ukrainian football striker who plays for FC Poltava in the Ukrainian First League.

External links 
 Profile on Official Website
 

1988 births
Living people
Ukrainian footballers
FC Naftovyk-Ukrnafta Okhtyrka players
FC Desna Chernihiv players
FK Dukla Prague players
FC Stal Kamianske players
FC Poltava players
Ukrainian expatriate footballers
Expatriate footballers in the Czech Republic
Expatriate footballers in Lithuania
Place of birth missing (living people)
Association football forwards